Taras Hromyak (born March 19, 1993) is a Ukrainian footballer currently playing with Nyva Terebovlia in the Ukrainian Amateur Football League.

Playing career 
Hromyak played in the Ivano-Frankivsk Oblast Football Federation in 2013 with FC Kalush. In 2014, he reached the professional ranks by signing with FC Ternopil in the Ukrainian First League. After the relegation of Ternopil in 2017 he went abroad to play in the Canadian Soccer League with FC Ukraine United. In his debut season he finished as the top goalscorer in the CSL Second Division with 15 goals. He also assisted in producing a perfect season for Ukraine United, along with a division and championship title. 

In 2019, he returned to the Ukrainian Amateur Football League to play with Nyva Terebovlia.

References 

1993 births
Living people
Sportspeople from Ternopil
Ukrainian footballers
FC Kalush players
FC Ternopil players
FC Ukraine United players
Canadian Soccer League (1998–present) players
Association football midfielders
Ukrainian First League players